Elisa Gräve (born 18 October 1996) is a German field hockey player for the German national team.

She participated at the 2018 Women's Hockey World Cup.

References

1995 births
Living people
German female field hockey players
Female field hockey midfielders
21st-century German women